Kathryn Jones Harrison (born 1924) is a leader of the Confederated Tribes of the Grand Ronde Community of Oregon.

Early life and education
Kathryn May Jones was born in 1924. Her parents died from an influenza pandemic was she was ten years old. She was abused in foster care in Buxton, Oregon, before she attended Salem's Chemawa Indian School. During the 1970s, she enrolled at Lane Community College's School of Nursing.

Career
After graduating from Lane, she worked at Lincoln City Hospital. She lived near the Siletz Reservation and was elected to serve as secretary of the Tribal Council. In 1976, she testified before Congress, advocating for federal tribal recognition. She returned to Grand Ronde to advocate for tribal status, which was granted in 1983. She has been credited for helping to pass the Reservation Restoration Act of 1988 and establishing Spirit Mountain Casino.

Personal life and recognition
She married Frank Harrison, a classmate from Chemawa. The couple had ten children.

She received an honorary doctorate in Humane Letters from Portland State University and was named Alumna of the Year by Lane Community College. She has also been named an Oregon History Maker by the Oregon Historical Society.

On June 10, 2021, the superintendent of the Corvallis (OR) School Board recommended that Jaguar Elementary (formerly Jefferson Elementary) be renamed Kathryn Harrison Elementary.  A naming ceremony took place at the school on May 5th, 2022 with Kathryn in attendance.

Bibliography

See also

 Oregon Women of Achievement

References

External links
 Kathryn Jones Harrison, University of Portland

1924 births
Living people
People from Oregon
Lane Community College alumni
Native American people from Oregon
20th-century Native American women
20th-century Native Americans
21st-century Native American women
21st-century Native Americans